Timothy J. "Tim" Sullivan has been the East Sports Editor of the Associated Press since 2010, and was the Deputy Sports Editor of the New York Post from 2004 to 2010. A 1994 graduate of Duquesne University in Pittsburgh, he also wrote two weekly college sports-related columns for the Post, named The City Game and On Campus.

Sullivan has held similar positions at the Pittsburgh Post-Gazette, the Florida Times-Union and the St. Petersburg Times.

An author, Sullivan's first book was released in 2012, and is titled Battle On The Hudson: The Devils, The Rangers, And The NHL's Greatest Series Ever.

In January 2007, Sullivan became a member of Duquesne's Athletics Advisory Board.

In October 2007, Sullivan became a member of the Heisman Trophy selection committee.

Sullivan is a 1990 graduate of Saint Joseph Regional High School in Montvale, New Jersey. He resides in Fair Haven, New Jersey.

External links and references 
 https://www.amazon.com/Battle-Hudson-Devils-Rangers-Greatest/dp/1600787274/
 https://archive.today/20130205022600/http://www.triumphbooks.com/products/battle_on_the_hudson/1572436503.php?page_id=460
 https://twitter.com/BattleHudson
 http://www.nypost.com/seven/12142007/sports/gang_green_976749.htm?page=0
 http://www.nypost.com/seven/02182007/sports/no_rest_for_weare_sports_tim_sullivan.htm?page=0
 https://web.archive.org/web/20070128204753/http://www.nypost.com/seven/12212006/sports/its_crystal_clear__take_the_gators_sports_tim_sullivan.htm

American newspaper editors
Duquesne University alumni
Living people
New York Post people
People from Fair Haven, New Jersey
Saint Joseph Regional High School alumni
Year of birth missing (living people)